The Emotions are an American doo-wop vocal group from New York City, United States.

The group was formed in 1958 by Joe Favale (lead vocal, b.1940), who had been singing with a group called The Moments, and Tony Maltese (tenor), who had another group, The Runarounds.   They recruited singers Dom Colurra (bass), Larry Cusamano (second tenor) and Joe Nigro (baritone), and found a manager, Henry Boye.  Initially calling themselves The Runarounds, they renamed themselves as The Emotions in 1959.  In 1962, they won a contract with Kapp Records, and released "Echo", a song written by Favale but credited jointly to the group and Boye.   The record was chosen as a "pick hit of the week" by leading DJ Murray the K, and rose to number 76 on the Billboard pop chart.

After further singles on Kapp and Laurie, the group signed for the 20th Century Fox label in 1963 and released their version of "A Story Untold", which became a regional hit.  However, later recordings were less successful and, after a series of personnel changes but still fronted by Favale, the group finally broke up in 1970.  Favale reformed the group with new personnel in 1982, and recorded an album for Columbia Records.  The group continues to perform, with a line-up of Joe Favale, George Winter, Vic Guzman, and Carmine Laietta.

References

External links
 

Doo-wop groups
American vocal groups